"Lhůta záruční" (English "Warranty period") is a single from the album Katarze of Czech pop music group Slza. The song was released on Spotify, Apple Music, iTunes, Deezer, and Google Play; on October 19, 2014 a video clip for a song was uploaded to YouTube. A video clip that has over 18,500,000 views on YouTube has been launched by Ondřej Urbanec, Charlie Straight or Tata Bojs. "Lhůta záruční" has won 2nd place in the Bacardi Music Awards 2014. The song soon became a big hit and in the charts came first. This is the only one that the Slza band is famous for.

References 

Slza songs
2014 singles
2014 songs
Universal Music Group singles
Songs written by Xindl X